Club Santos Laguna has had a total of twenty coaches throughout their history in the Primera División, the coach varies in its functions implemented in the football section, responsible for study, plan, assess and evaluate the players. The club has had multiple service coaches, most of them Mexican nationals have been sixteen, counting ten times the services of foreign coaches five Argentines, two Uruguayans, Chilean, a Honduran and a Portuguese.

List of managers 

Santos Laguna managers